This is a list of player transfers involving Pro12 teams before or during the 2015–16 season.

Benetton Treviso

Players in
 Simone Ferrari from  AS Rugby Milano
 Duncan Naude from  RC Chalon
 Jean-François Montauriol from  Rovigo Delta
 Andrea De Marchi from  Rovigo Delta
 Filo Paulo from  Cardiff Blues
 Robert Barbieri from  Leicester Tigers
 Alberto De Marchi from  Sale Sharks
 Luke McLean from  Sale Sharks
 Tom Palmer from  Gloucester Rugby
 Luca Bigi from  Petrarca
 Filippo Filippetto from  San Donà
 Ornel Gega from  Mogliano
 Braam Steyn from  Calvisano
 Cherif Traorè from  Viadana
 Tommaso Iannone from  Zebre
 Chris Smylie from  Hurricanes
 Roberto Santamaria from  Viadana

Players out
 Simone Favaro to  Glasgow Warriors
 Michele Campagnaro to  Exeter Chiefs
 Joe Carlisle to  London Welsh
 Corniel van Zyl retired
 Paul Derbyshire to  Zebre
 Giovanni Maistri to  Petrarca
 Antonio Pavanello retired
 Ruggero Trevisan retired
 Romulo Acosta  to  Petrarca
 Albert Anae to  Brumbies
 Amar Kudin to  San Dona
 Mat Luamanu to  Harlequins
 Tomás Vallejos to  Stade Francais
 Josè Francisco Novak to  UAL Rugby
 Nicola Cattina to  Patarò Lumezzane
 Bruno Mercanti to  Bizkaia Gernika
 Meyer Swanepoel released
 Henry Seniloli released

Cardiff Blues

Players in
 Tom James from  Exeter Chiefs
 Rey Lee-Lo from  Hurricanes
 Blaine Scully from  Leicester Tigers
 Cam Dolan from  Northampton Saints
 James Down from  London Welsh
 Nicky Griffiths from  Wales Sevens

Players out
 Rory Watts-Jones retired
 Filo Paulo to  Benetton Treviso
 Adam Jones to  Harlequins
 Joaquin Tuculet to  Jaguares
 Dafydd Hewitt retired
 Simon Humberstone to  Doncaster Knights
 Tom Williams to  Scarlets (season-loan)
 Marc Breeze to  Cardiff RFC
 Lucas González Amorosino to  Munster

Connacht

Players in
 Ultan Dillane promoted from academy
 Quinn Roux from  Leinster
 Eoghan Masterson promoted from academy
 Caolin Blade promoted from academy
 John Cooney from  Leinster
 Nepia Fox-Matamua from  Auckland
 Ben Marshall from  Leinster
 Api Pewhairangi from  New Zealand Warriors
 AJ MacGinty from  Life Running Eagles

Players out

 Willie Faloon to  Ulster
 Michael Swift retired
 Mils Muliaina to  Zebre
 Mick Kearney to  Leinster
 Shane Layden to  Ireland Sevens
 Miah Nikora to  Petrarca
 Seán Henry retired
 Mata Fifita to  Galway Tribesmen

Edinburgh

Players in
 William Helu from  Wasps
 Nasi Manu from  Highlanders
 Nathan Fowles from  Sale Sharks
 Michael Allen from  Ulster
 Jack Cosgrove from  Worcester Warriors
 John Hardie from  Highlanders

Players out
 Tom Heathcote to  Worcester Warriors
 Grayson Hart to  Glasgow Warriors
 Ollie Atkins to  Exeter Chiefs
 Tim Visser to  Harlequins
 Hugh Blake to  Glasgow Warriors
 Roddy Grant retired

Glasgow Warriors

Players in
 Simone Favaro from  Benetton Treviso
 Grayson Hart from  Edinburgh
 Shalva Mamukashvili from  Sale Sharks
 Kieran Low from  London Irish
 Mike Blair from  Newcastle Falcons
 Sam Johnson from  Queensland Reds
 Greg Peterson from  Leicester Tigers
 Taqele Naiyaravoro from  NSW Waratahs
 Javan Sebastian from  Scarlets
 Jason Hill from  Heriot's Rugby Club
 Rory Clegg from  Newcastle Falcons
 Gary Strain from  Glasgow Hawks
 Steven Findlay from  Glasgow Hawks
 Hugh Blake from  Edinburgh

 Sila Puafisi from  Gloucester Rugby

Players out

 Nikola Matawalu to  Bath Rugby
 Sean Maitland to  London Irish
 D. T. H. van der Merwe to  Scarlets
 Dougie Hall retired
 Jon Welsh to  Newcastle Falcons
 Alastair Kellock retired
 Murray McConnell to  Nottingham
 James Downey to  Wasps
 Tommy Spinks to  Jersey
 Euan Murray to  Pau
 Connor Braid to  Canada Sevens
 Rossouw de Klerk to  Grenoble

Leinster

Players in
 Johnny Sexton from  Racing 92
 Royce Burke-Flynn from  Clontarf
 Ed Byrne promoted from Academy
 Bryan Byrne promoted from Academy
 Ian Hirst from  Clontarf
 Mick Kearney from  Connacht
 Dan Leavy promoted from Academy
 Cathal Marsh promoted from Academy
 Josh van der Flier promoted from Academy
 Isa Nacewa from  Blues
 Tadhg Beirne promoted from Academy
 Gavin Thornbury promoted from Academy
 Hayden Triggs from  Blues

Players out
 Jimmy Gopperth to  Wasps
 John Cooney to  Connacht
 Jordan Coghlan to  Munster
 Quinn Roux to  Connacht
 Shane Jennings retired
 Sam Coghlan Murray to  Nottingham
 Gordon D'Arcy retired
 Seán McCarthy to  Jersey
 Brendan Macken to  Wasps
 Ben Marshall to  Connacht
 Kane Douglas to  Queensland Reds
 Tyrone Moran to  London Scottish
 Kevin McLaughlin retired

Munster

Players in
 Tomás O'Leary from  London Irish
 Jordan Coghlan from  Leinster
 Francis Saili from  Blues
 Matt D'Arcy from  Clontarf
 Mark Chisholm from  Bayonne
 Shane Monahan from  Gloucester
 Mario Sagario from  Massy
 Lucas González Amorosino from  Cardiff Blues
 Sean Doyle from  Brumbies

Players out
 JJ Hanrahan to  Northampton Saints
 Sean Dougall to  Pau
 Damien Varley retired
 Alan Cotter to  Aix-en-Provence
 Paddy Butler to  Pau
 Paul O'Connell to  Toulon
 Luke O'Dea to  SC Lille
 Barry O'Mahony retired
 Johne Murphy retired
 Donncha O'Callaghan to  Worcester Warriors
 Andrew Smith to  Brumbies
 Felix Jones retired
 Eusebio Guiñazú released
 Ivan Dineen released
 Martin Kelly released

Newport Gwent Dragons

Players in
 Sarel Pretorius from  Free State Cheetahs
 Ed Jackson from  Wasps
 Charlie Davies from  Wasps
 Adam Warren from  Scarlets
 Nick Scott from  London Welsh
 Shaun Knight from  Gloucester Rugby

Players out

 Steffan Jones to  Bedford Blues
 Jonathan Evans to  Bath Rugby
 Owen Evans to  Harlequins
 Lee Byrne retired
 Ian Gough retired
 Ashley Smith retired
 Dave Young to  London Scottish
 Dan Way retired
 Andy Powell to  Merthyr RFC
 Richie Rees to  Cross Keys RFC

Ospreys

Players in
 Paul James from  Bath Rugby
 Brendon Leonard from  Zebre
 Gareth Delve from  NEC Green Rockets
 Kristian Phillips from  Scarlets
 Oliver Tomaszczyk from  Newcastle Falcons
 Ma'afu Fia from  Highlanders

Players out
 Nicky Thomas to  Gloucester Rugby
 Sam Lewis to  Worcester Warriors
 Duncan Jones retired
 Morgan Allen to  Scarlets
 Aisea Natoga to  US Carcassonne
 Ross Jones to  Rotherham Titans
 Tevita Cavubati to  Worcester Warriors
 Andrew Bishop retired
 Tom Smith retired
 De Kock Steenkamp released
 Cai Griffiths to  AS Rugby Milano

Scarlets

Players in
 D. T. H. van der Merwe from  Glasgow Warriors
 Aled Thomas from  Gloucester Rugby
 Will Taylor from  Wasps
 Tom Price from  Leicester Tigers
 Dylan Evans from  NSW Country Eagles
 Jack Condy from  Cross Keys
 Morgan Allen from  Ospreys
 Tom Williams from  Cardiff Blues (season-loan)

Players out
 Rhys Priestland to  Bath Rugby
 Darran Harris to  Rotherham Titans
 Jacobie Adriaanse to  Montpellier
 Sion Bennett to  Northampton Saints
 Kyle Evans to  Moseley
 Adam Warren to  Newport Gwent Dragons
 Joe Snyman to  CA Brive
 Javan Sebastian to  Glasgow Warriors
 Kristian Phillips to  Ospreys
 Richard Kelly retired
 Frazier Climo to  Ayr RFC
 Rob McCusker to  London Irish

Ulster

Players in
 Willie Faloon from  Connacht
 Sam Windsor from  Worcester Warriors
 Paul Rowley from  London Welsh
 Peter Browne from  London Welsh

Players out
 Charlie Butterworth to  Jersey
 Ross Adair to  Jersey
 Declan Fitzpatrick retired
 Michael Allen to  Edinburgh Rugby
 Ricky Andrew to  Nottingham
 Michael Heaney to  Doncaster Knights
 Dave Ryan to  Agen
 Neil McComb to  Belfast Harlequins
 Mike McComish released

Zebre

Players in
 Mils Muliaina from  Connacht
 Luke Burgess from  Melbourne Rebels
 Pietro Ceccarelli from  AS Macon
 Marcello Violi from  Calvisano
 Federico Ruzza from  Viadana
 Tommaso Boni from  Mogliano
 Kayle van Zyl from  Mogliano
 Carlo Canna from  Fiamme Oro
 Emiliano Coria from  Montpellier
 Emiliano Caffini from  Rovigo Delta
 Guillermo Roan from  Rovigo Delta
 Paul Derbyshire from  Benetton Treviso
 Bruno Postiglioni from  La Plata
 Jean Cook from  Cheetahs
 Ulrich Beyers from  Bordeaux Begles
 Johan Meyer from

Players out
 Brendon Leonard to  Ospreys
 Andries Ferreira to  Lions
 Samuela Vunisa to  Saracens
 Giovanbattista Venditti to  Newcastle Falcons
 Mauro Bergamasco retired
 Luca Redolfini to  Rugby Reggio
 Luciano Orquera to  RC Massy
 Tommaso Iannone to  Benetton Treviso
 Luciano Leibson to  RC Massy
 Andrei Mahu to  Lyons Piacenza
 Alberto Chillon to  Rovigo Delta
 Lorenzo Romano to  Viadana
 David Odiete to  Mogliano
 Hennie Daniller to 
 Matías Agüero to  Leicester Tigers

See also
List of 2015–16 Premiership Rugby transfers
List of 2015–16 Top 14 transfers
List of 2015–16 Super Rugby transfers
List of 2015–16 RFU Championship transfers
List of 2015 SuperLiga transfers

References

2015–16 Pro12
2015-16